HSSP (Homology-derived Secondary Structure of Proteins) is a database that combines structural and sequence information about proteins. This database has the information of the alignment of all available homologs of proteins from the PDB database As a result of this, HSSP is also a database of homology-based implied protein structures.

See also
 Protein Data Bank (PDB)
 STING

References

External links 

 HSSP

Biological databases
Protein structure